Psychrobacter immobilis is a Gram-negative, oxidase- and catalase-positive, psychrotrophic, nonmotile bacterium of the genus Psychrobacter which was isolated from cheese, fish, and processed meat and poultry products.

References

Further reading

External links
Type strain of Psychrobacter immobilis at BacDive -  the Bacterial Diversity Metadatabase

Moraxellaceae
Bacteria described in 1986
Psychrophiles